Nauraspur was a former city in what is today India.  It was founded in 1599 by Ibrahim Adil Shah II, the Sultan of Bijapur.  It was destroyed in 1624.

Sources
Asher, Catherine B. and Cynthia Talbor. India Before Europe. (New York: Cambridge University Press, 2006) p. 169.

Populated places established in 1599